The Schizophyllaceae are a family of fungi in the order Agaricales. The family contains two genera and seven species. Species cause white rot in hardwoods. The most common member of the genus Schizophyllum is Schizophyllum commune, a widely distributed mushroom. It looks like an oyster mushroom, but is one-fifth the size.

See also
List of Agaricales families

References

External links

 
Agaricales families